Nadir Lamyaghri (born 13 February 1976) is a Moroccan former footballer who last played as a goalkeeper for Wydad Casablanca.

Career
Lamyaghri first broke on the scene in Racing Casablanca from 1995 to 2000 and was later to join Wydad Casablanca for a season. While on loan to Hassania Agadir, he secured a win in the Moroccan League. As quickly as he returned to Morocco and Wydad, he soon departed to the United Arab Emirates and Al-Wahda for a season.

International career
He was a member of the Moroccan 2004 Olympic football team that exited in the first round, finishing third in group D behind group winners Iraq and runners-up Costa Rica. Playing for Morocco in the 2004 African Cup of Nations, the team came in second place.

Honours
Hassania Agadir
Moroccan League: 2002

Wydad Casablanca
Moroccan League: 2006, 2010
Coupe du Trône: 2001
African Cup Winners' Cup: 2002

Individual
 Best Goalkeeper in Moroccan League (2) : 2006, 2010.

References

External links
 

1976 births
Living people
Moroccan footballers
Footballers from Casablanca
Moroccan expatriate footballers
Morocco international footballers
2004 African Cup of Nations players
2006 Africa Cup of Nations players
2008 Africa Cup of Nations players
2012 Africa Cup of Nations players
2013 Africa Cup of Nations players
Botola players
Wydad AC players
Al Wahda FC players
Olympic footballers of Morocco
Footballers at the 2004 Summer Olympics
Association football goalkeepers
Hassania Agadir players
Expatriate footballers in the United Arab Emirates
Moroccan expatriate sportspeople in the United Arab Emirates
Morocco A' international footballers
2014 African Nations Championship players